Hyposmocoma menehune is a species of moth of the family Cosmopterigidae. It is endemic to Nihoa. The type locality is Miller Canyon.

The wingspan is 7.2–7.4 mm.

The larval case is burrito-shaped and 3.7–4.0 mm in length. It is similar to that of Hyposmocoma nihoa, but without the distinctly curved pointed distal end.

Adults were reared from case-making larvae. Larvae were collected on the ground.

External links
New species of Hyposmocoma (Lepidoptera, Cosmopterigidae) from the remote Northwestern Hawaiian Islands of Laysan, Necker, and Nihoa

menehune
Endemic moths of Hawaii
Moths described in 2009